Barium acetate (Ba(C2H3O2)2) is the salt of barium(II) and acetic acid. Barium acetate is toxic to humans, but has use in chemistry and manufacturing.

Preparation

Barium acetate is generally produced by the reaction of acetic acid with barium carbonate:

BaCO3 + 2CH3COOH → (CH3COO)2Ba + CO2 + H2O

The reaction is performed in solution and the barium acetate crystalizes out at temperatures above 41 °C. Between 25 and 40 °C, the monohydrate version crystalizes. Alternatively, barium sulfide can be used:

BaS + 2CH3COOH → (CH3COO)2Ba + H2S

Again, the solvent is evaporated off and the barium acetate crystallized.

Properties

Barium acetate is a white powder, which is highly soluble: at 0 °C, 55.8 g of barium acetate can be dissolved in 100 g of water. It decomposes upon heating into barium carbonate.

Reactions

When heated in air, barium acetate decomposes to the carbonate. It reacts with acids: reaction with sulfuric acid, hydrochloric acid and nitric acid give the sulfate, chloride and nitrate respectively.

Uses

Barium acetate is used as a mordant for printing textile fabrics, for drying paints and varnishes and in lubricating oil. In chemistry, it is used in the preparation of other acetates; and as a catalyst in organic synthesis.

In pop culture 
Barium Acetate was featured in a 2001 episode of the television series Forensic Files, recounting the 1993 murder of a man by his teenage daughter (Marie Robards), though the episode and other crime documentary shows examining the Robards case excluded the mention of barium acetate. 

Barium Acetate was featured in a 2014 episode of the crime documentary series Redrum.

Barium acetate was named as the choice poison of a teen's murder of her father in Deadly Women "Parents Peril", S6 E2.

References

Further reading
 
 After husband's body was found burned, woman is suspected of poisoning another man

Barium compounds
Acetates